Zhang Jun (born October 1956) is a Chinese lawyer, politician and judge, who is currently the chief justice and president of the Supreme People's Court. Between 2018 and 2023, he served as the procurator-General of the Supreme People’s Procuratorate, and the Minister of Justice between 2017-2018. He formerly served as Vice Minister of the Ministry of Justice of the People's Republic of China and Vice President of the Supreme People's Court.

Biography
Zhang was born in Boxing County, Shandong province, and joined the Chinese Communist Party (CCP) in May 1974. 

Zhang graduated from Jilin University's department of law in 1982. He received a Master of Law in criminal law from the Renmin University of China in 1985 and a Doctor of Law in criminal law from Wuhan University in 2006.

Zhang joined the Changchun municipal propaganda department under the Communist Youth League of China in 1975. In 1978, with the restoration of state exams, he was able to join the Jilin University's Faculty of Law. He started working in the Supreme People's Court in 1985.

During his tenure in the  Supreme People's Court, Zhang served as clerk of the criminal office, Deputy Director and later Director of the Criminal Department, Deputy Director of Research and other roles, receiver of special government allowances in 2000. In 2001, Zhang had briefly served as executive vice president of the Beijing Municipal Higher People's Court; and upon his return to the Supreme People's Court, he was promoted to vice president of the higher courts, membership in the Trial Committee and was made a judge.

In July 2003, he transferred to serve as Vice Minister of Justice. From April 2008 onward, he served as deputy party group secretary of the Supreme People's Court, becoming a minister-level official. In November 2011, Zhang was promoted to judge of the first grade.

In October 2012, Zhang resigned his posts in the Supreme People's Court and in the 8th session of the Seventeenth Chinese Communist Party Central Commission for Discipline Inspection, he was selected as deputy secretary. On November 2012, Zhang extended his term as deputy secretary of the CCDI during the first session of the 18th Central Commission for Discipline Inspection.

In February 2017, Zhang was appointed as the Minister of Justice by the Standing Committee of the National People's Congress.

In March 2018, Zhang was elected as the Procurator-General of the Supreme People's Procuratorate.

Academia 
 Vice President of China's Criminal Law Research Society

References 

1956 births
Living people
Renmin University of China alumni
Jilin University alumni
Wuhan University alumni
People's Republic of China politicians from Shandong
Supreme People's Court judges
Procurator-General of the Supreme People's Procuratorate
Ministers of Justice of the People's Republic of China
Members of the 19th Central Committee of the Chinese Communist Party
20th-century Chinese judges
21st-century Chinese judges